Padwick is a surname, and may refer to:

 Constance E. Padwick (1886–1968), English missionary
 E. W. Padwick (1923–2010), bibliographer of cricket
 Henry Padwick (1805–1879), English solicitor, figure of the horse racing world and moneylender
 Philip Hugh Padwick (1876–1958), English painter 
 William Padwick, figure in the development of Hayling Island